Trans and Nonbinary Kids Mix is a 2020 children's music album with songs about the "trans and nonbinary experience".

References

2020 compilation albums
2020 in LGBT history
Children's music albums
LGBT-related albums
Transgender-related music